Epepeotes plorator is a species of beetle in the family Cerambycidae. It was described by Newman in 1842. It is known from Sulawesi and the Philippines.

Subspecies
 Epepeotes plorator celebensis Aurivillius, 1921
 Epepeotes plorator plorator (Newman, 1842)
 Epepeotes plorator sanghiricus Breuning, 1938
 Epepeotes plorator uniformis Breuning, 1943

References

plorator
Beetles described in 1842